Dapeng Wu is an electrical engineer at the University of Florida in Gainesville. He was named a Fellow of the Institute of Electrical and Electronics Engineers (IEEE) in 2013 for his contributions to video communications, processing, and wireless networking.

References 

Fellow Members of the IEEE
Living people
Year of birth missing (living people)
University of Florida faculty
Place of birth missing (living people)